The 2018 San Antonio FC season was the club's third season of existence. Including the San Antonio Thunder of the original NASL and the former San Antonio Scorpions of the modern NASL, this was the 9th season of professional soccer in San Antonio. The club played in the United Soccer League, the second division of the United States soccer league system, and participated in the U.S. Open Cup.

Club
Coaching staff
{|class="wikitable"
|-
!Position
!Staff
|-
|Head Coach|| Darren Powell
|-
|Assistant Coach|| Andy Thomson
|-
|Assistant Coach/SAFC Pro Academy Director|| Nick Evans
|-
|Assistant Coach/Goalkeeping Director|| Juan Lamadrid
|-
|Head Athletic Trainer|| Adam Quigley
|-
|Equipment Manager|| Rashad Moore
|-Other information

|-

Squad information

First team squad

Player movement

In

Out

Loan in

Loan out

Pre-season 
The pre-season match against FC Dallas was announced by FCD on January 18, 2018. Remaining pre-season matches were announced on January 30, 2018, by SAFC.

Competitions

Overall 
Position in the Western Conference

Overview 

{| class="wikitable" style="text-align: center"
|-
!rowspan=2|Competition
!colspan=8|Record
|-
!
!
!
!
!
!
!
!
|-
| United Soccer League

|-
| U.S. Open Cup

|-
! Total

United Soccer League

League table

Results summary

Results by matchday 

Position in the Western Conference

Matches 
The first three matches of 2018 were announced on January 12, 2018. The remaining schedule was released on January 19, 2018. Home team is listed first, left to right.

Kickoff times are in CDT (UTC−05) unless shown otherwise

Lamar Hunt U.S. Open Cup

Exhibition 
On June 7, 2017, it was announced that San Antonio would play an exhibition match against Santos Laguna.

Statistics

Appearances 
Discipline includes league, playoffs, and Open Cup play.

Top scorers 
The list is sorted by shirt number when total goals are equal.

Clean sheets 
The list is sorted by shirt number when total clean sheets are equal.

Summary

Awards

Player

References

San Antonio FC seasons
San Antonio
San Antonio FC
San Antonio FC